The 1968 Tirreno–Adriatico was the third edition of the Tirreno–Adriatico cycle race and was held from 12 March to 16 March 1968. The race started in Santa Marinella and finished in San Benedetto del Tronto. The race was won by Claudio Michelotto.

General classification

References

1968
1968 in Italian sport